Adam David Thompson is an American actor known for his roles in Outsiders, Godless, Mozart in the Jungle, and others.

Career 
Thompson made his feature film debut opposite Elizabeth Olsen in thriller Martha Marcy May Marlene in 2011. This was followed up by supporting roles in A Walk Among the Tombstones and 10 Things I Hate About Life. He starred opposite Lucy Walters and Shane West in post-apocalyptic film, Here Alone which premiered at the 2016 Tribeca Film Festival and was released theatrically on March 30, 2017. The film received the Audience Award at the 2016 Tribeca Film Festival

Filmography

Film

Television

References 

Living people
Year of birth missing (living people)